Ženski košarkaški klub Radnički, commonly referred to as Radnički Belgrade, is a women's basketball club based in Belgrade, Serbia. The club currently participates in the Second Basketball League of Serbia.

Honours
National Championships – 6
Yugoslav Women's Basketball League:
Winners (6) : 1961, 1962, 1964, 1965, 1966, 1968
Runners-up (6) : 1946, 1956, 1958, 1959, 1960, 1967

National Cups – 2

Yugoslav Women's Basketball Cup:
Winners (2) : 1960, 1962

Notable former coaches
Ranko Žeravica
Borivoje Cenić
Branko Kovačević
Milan Dabović
Goran Duraković

See also 
 List of basketball clubs in Serbia by major honours won

External links
 
 Profile on srbijasport.net

Radnicki Beograd
Basketball teams in Belgrade
Women's basketball teams in Yugoslavia
Basketball teams established in 1945
Zvezdara